Paretroplus dambabe is an endangered species of cichlid from the Mahavavy du Sud river basin, including Lake Kinkony, in northwestern Madagascar. It has declined drastically due to habitat loss, invasive species and over-fishing. This relatively large and deep-bodied Paretroplus reaches almost  in length. Although collected as early as the 1960s, it was long confused with P. petiti and therefore only described as a species in 2002.

In the aquarium
This tends to be an aggressive cichlid, especially during mating. It is important that at least 6 individuals are kept. Otherwise, the risk of having one fish being picked on and killed will increase. They are very easily susceptible to disease Ich.

References

dambabe
Freshwater fish of Madagascar
Cichlid fish of Africa
Fish described in 2002
Fishkeeping
Taxonomy articles created by Polbot